Tricetinidin is an intense red-colored chemical compound belonging to the 3-deoxyanthocyanidins. It can be found in black tea infusions. Tricetinidin, in tea, would be a product of the oxidative degallation of epigallocatechin gallate (EGCG).

References

Anthocyanidins
Pyrogallols
Resorcinols